Shima may refer to:

Places

, Japan
 Shima Province (志摩), one of the old provinces of Japan
 Shima, Fukuoka (志摩), a former town in Fukuoka Prefecture
 Shima, Mie (志摩), a city in Mie Prefecture
 Shima, Mie (town), a former town in Mie Prefecture that merged with its neighbors to become Shima City

Shima (石马镇), China
 Shima, Dazu County, in Dazu County, Chongqing
 Shima, Meizhou, in Xingning City, Meizhou City, Guangdong
 Shima, Yongfeng County, in Yongfeng County, Jiangxi
 Shima, Zibo, in Boshan District, Zibo, Shandong
 Shima, Mianyang, in Youxian District, Mianyang, Sichuan
 Shima, Cangxi County, in Cangxi County, Sichuan

Elsewhere
Shim'a, West Bank

People
 Shima (surname), a Japanese surname
 Shima (given name), a given name
 Queen Shima, the queen of Kalingga kingdom, circa 674 CE, Central Java
 Shima Iwashita
 Mr. Shima (stage name), the ringname for Japanese pro-wrestler Akio Sato (wrestler)

Other uses
 Shima (film), a 2007 film from Uzbekistan
 Shima is the Unicode name of the Coptic letter ϭ (Tshēma)

See also
Jima (disambiguation), also "island" in Japanese
Shiba (disambiguation)
Shiwa (disambiguation)